NikeFuel is a proprietary unit of measurement for tracking fitness activity developed by the athletics company Nike, Inc. The exact formula for the measuring unit was proprietary and depended on the device or service tracking it. The general idea is that activity and movement — whether tracked by a wearable electronics device, GPS tracking service, or game — is translated into a universal point system for physical activity. However, in 2018, NikeFuel app and the NikeFuel section disappeared.

The points system is one of the main differentiators of the slate of devices and services under the Nike+ brand. All products under the brand allow the user to earn NikeFuel. Products include the Nike+ FuelBand accelerometer wristband; other wristbands such as SportWatch and SportBand; Nike+ for iPod, the Nike+ Running and Nike+ Basketball mobile applications for iOS and Android; and the Nike+ Kinect Training motion-tracking exercise game for the Xbox.

See also 
 Nike+ FuelBand
 Nike+
 Nike, Inc.
 Activity tracker
 GPS watch
 Smartwatch

References 

Nike, Inc.